Sa Kaeo may refer to several locations in Thailand:
Sa Kaeo town
Sa Kaeo Province
Sa Kaeo district
Sa Kaeo Refugee Camp